WTRP (620 AM) is a radio station broadcasting a classic country format and is licensed to LaGrange, Georgia, United States. AM 620 WTRP is dedicated to the people of Troup County with local and statewide news, weather, and sports. WTRP is the flagship station for LaGrange College Panthers football, baseball, and basketball teams, Bill Bailey serving as the voice of the Panthers. WTRP is also home to the most Troup County High School Sports coverage on the radio with high school football coverage of the Lafayette Christian School Cougars. WTRP is home to baseball and basketball coverage of Troup, LaGrange, Callaway, LaGrange Academy and Lafayette Christian School. The station is currently owned by Tiger Communications, Inc. and features programming from Westwood One.

On April 20, 2022, WTRP changed its format from classic hits as "Troup 98.9" to classic country as "Classic Country 98.9" with a playlist centered from the 1980s to the early 2000s.

References

External links

TRP
LaGrange Panthers
Classic country radio stations in the United States